Sodium thiopental, also known as Sodium Pentothal (a trademark of Abbott Laboratories), thiopental, thiopentone, or Trapanal (also a trademark), is a rapid-onset short-acting barbiturate general anesthetic. It is the thiobarbiturate analog of pentobarbital, and an analog of thiobarbital. Sodium thiopental was a core medicine in the World Health Organization's List of Essential Medicines, but was supplanted by propofol. Despite this, thiopental is listed as an acceptable alternative to propofol, depending on local availability and cost of these agents. It was previously the first of three drugs administered during most lethal injections in the United States, but the US manufacturer Hospira stopped manufacturing the drug in 2011 and the European Union banned the export of the drug for this purpose. Although thiopental abuse carries a dependency risk, its recreational use is rare.

Uses

Anesthesia
Sodium thiopental is an ultra-short-acting barbiturate and has been used commonly in the induction phase of general anesthesia. Its use has been largely replaced with that of propofol, but may retain some popularity as an induction agent for rapid-sequence induction and intubation, such as in obstetrics. Following intravenous injection, the drug rapidly reaches the brain and causes unconsciousness within 30–45 seconds. At one minute, the drug attains a peak concentration of about 60% of the total dose in the brain. Thereafter, the drug distributes to the rest of the body, and in about 5–10 minutes the concentration is low enough in the brain that consciousness returns.

A normal dose of sodium thiopental (usually 4–6 mg/kg) given to a pregnant woman for operative delivery (caesarean section) rapidly makes her unconscious, but the baby in her uterus remains conscious. However, larger or repeated doses can depress the baby's consciousness.

Sodium thiopental is not used to maintain anesthesia in surgical procedures because, in infusion, it displays zero-order elimination pharmacokinetics, leading to a long period before consciousness is regained. Instead, anesthesia is usually maintained with an inhaled anesthetic (gas) agent. Inhaled anesthetics are eliminated relatively quickly, so that stopping the inhaled anesthetic will allow rapid return of consciousness. Sodium thiopental would have to be given in large amounts to maintain unconsciousness during anaesthesia due to its rapid redistribution throughout the body (as it has a high volume of distribution). Since its half-life of 5.5 to 26 hours is quite long, consciousness would take a long time to return.

In veterinary medicine, sodium thiopental is used to induce anesthesia in animals. Since it is redistributed to fat, certain lean breeds of dogs such as sighthounds will have prolonged recoveries from sodium thiopental due to their lack of body fat and their lean body mass. Conversely, obese animals will have rapid recoveries, but it will take much longer for the drug to be entirely removed (metabolized) from their bodies. Sodium thiopental is always administered intravenously, as it can be fairly irritating to tissue and a vesicant; severe tissue necrosis and sloughing can occur if it is injected incorrectly into the tissue around a vein.

Medically-induced coma
In addition to anesthesia induction, sodium thiopental was historically used to induce medical comas. It has now been superseded by drugs such as propofol because their effects wear off more quickly than thiopental.
Patients with brain swelling, causing elevation of intracranial pressure, either secondary to trauma or following surgery, may benefit from this drug. Sodium thiopental, and the barbiturate class of drugs, decrease neuronal activity thereby decreasing cerebral metabolic rate of oxygen consumption (CMRO2), decrease the cerebrovascular response to carbon dioxide, which in turn decreases intracranial pressure. Patients with refractory elevated intracranial pressure (RICH) due to traumatic brain injury (TBI) may have improved long term outcome when barbiturate coma is added to their neurointensive care treatment.  Reportedly, thiopental has been shown to be superior to pentobarbital in reducing intracranial pressure. This phenomenon is also called an inverse steal or Robin Hood effect as cerebral perfusion to all parts of the brain is reduced (due to the decreased cerebrovascular response to carbon dioxide) allowing optimal perfusion to ischaemic areas of the brain which have higher metabolic demands, since vessels supplying ischaemic areas of the brain would already be maximally dilated because of the metabolic demand.

Status epilepticus
In refractory status epilepticus, thiopental may be used to terminate a seizure.

Euthanasia
Sodium thiopental is used intravenously for the purposes of euthanasia. In both Belgium and the Netherlands, where active euthanasia is allowed by law, the standard protocol recommends sodium thiopental as the ideal agent to induce coma, followed by pancuronium bromide to paralyze muscles and stop breathing.

Intravenous administration is the most reliable and rapid way to accomplish euthanasia. Death is quick. A coma is first induced by intravenous administration of 20 mg/kg thiopental sodium (Nesdonal) in a small volume (10 ml physiological saline). Then, a triple dose of a non-depolarizing neuromuscular blocking drug is given, such as 20 mg pancuronium bromide (Pavulon) or 20 mg vecuronium bromide (Norcuron). The muscle relaxant should be given intravenously to ensure optimal bioavailability but pancuronium bromide may be administered intramuscularly at an increased dosage level of 40 mg.

Lethal injection

Along with pancuronium bromide and potassium chloride, thiopental is used in 34 states of the US to execute prisoners by lethal injection. A very large dose is given to ensure rapid loss of consciousness. Although death usually occurs within ten minutes of the beginning of the injection process, some have been known to take longer. The use of sodium thiopental in execution protocols was challenged in court after a study in the medical journal The Lancet reported autopsies of executed inmates showed the level of thiopental in their bloodstream was insufficient to cause unconsciousness although this is dependent on different factors and not just on the drug itself. 

On December 8, 2009, Ohio became the first state to use a single dose of sodium thiopental for its capital execution, following the failed use of the standard three-drug cocktail during a recent execution, due to inability to locate suitable veins. Kenneth Biros was executed using the single-drug method.

Washington State became the second state in the US to use the single-dose sodium thiopental injections for executions. On September 10, 2010, the execution of Cal Coburn Brown was the first in the state to use a single-dose, single-drug injection. His death was pronounced approximately one and a half minutes after the intravenous administration of five grams of the drug.

After its use for the execution of Jeffrey Landrigan in the US, the United Kingdom introduced a ban on the export of sodium thiopental in December 2010, after it was established that no European supplies to the US were being used for any other purpose. The restrictions were based on "the European Union Torture Regulation (including licensing of drugs used in execution by lethal injection)". From 21 December 2011, the EU extended trade restrictions to prevent the export of certain medicinal products for capital punishment, stating that "the Union disapproves of capital punishment in all circumstances and works towards its universal abolition".

Truth serum

Thiopental is still used in places such as India as a truth serum to weaken the resolve of a subject and make the individual more compliant to pressure. Barbiturates decrease both higher cortical brain function and inhibition. It is hypothesized that because lying is a more mentally involving process than telling the truth, suppression of the higher cortical functions may lead to the uncovering of the truth. The drug tends to make subjects verbose and cooperative with interrogators; however, the reliability of confessions made under thiopental is questionable.

Psychiatry
Psychiatrists have used thiopental to desensitize patients with phobias and to "facilitate the recall of painful repressed memories." One psychiatrist who worked with thiopental is Jan Bastiaans, who used this procedure to help relieve trauma in surviving victims of the Holocaust.

Mechanism of action

Sodium thiopental is a member of the barbiturate class of drugs, which are relatively non-selective compounds that bind to an entire superfamily of ligand-gated ion channels, of which the GABAA receptor channel is one of several representatives. This superfamily of ion channels includes the neuronal nicotinic acetylcholine receptor (nAChR), the 5-HT3 receptor, the glycine receptor and others. Surprisingly, while GABAA receptor currents are increased by barbiturates (and other general anesthetics), ligand-gated ion channels that are predominantly permeable for cationic ions are blocked by these compounds. For example, neuronal nAChR are blocked by clinically relevant anesthetic concentrations of both sodium thiopental and pentobarbital. Such findings implicate (non-GABAergic) ligand-gated ion channels, e.g. the neuronal nAChR, in mediating some of the (side) effects of barbiturates. The GABAA receptor is an inhibitory channel that decreases neuronal activity, and barbiturates enhance the inhibitory action of the GABAA receptor.

Controversies
Following a shortage that led a court to delay an execution in California, a company spokesman for Hospira, the sole American manufacturer of the drug, objected to the use of thiopental in lethal injection. "Hospira manufactures this product because it improves or saves lives, and the company markets it solely for use as indicated on the product labeling. The drug is not indicated for capital punishment and Hospira does not support its use in this procedure." On January 21, 2011, the company announced that it would stop production of sodium thiopental from its plant in Italy, because it could not provide Italian authorities with guarantees that exported doses would not be used in executions. According to a company spokesperson, Italy was the only viable place where it could produce the drug, leaving the US without a supplier.

In October 2015 the U.S. Food and Drug Administration confiscated an overseas shipment of thiopental destined for the states of Arizona and Texas. FDA spokesman Jeff Ventura said in a statement, "Courts have concluded that sodium thiopental for the injection in humans is an unapproved drug and may not be imported into the country".

Metabolism
Thiopental rapidly and easily crosses the blood–brain barrier as it is a lipophilic molecule. As with all lipid-soluble anaesthetic drugs, the short duration of action of sodium thiopental is due almost entirely to its redistribution away from central circulation into muscle and fatty tissue, due to its very high lipid–water partition coefficient (approximately 10), leading to sequestration in fatty tissue. Once redistributed, the free fraction in the blood is metabolized in the liver by zero-order kinetics. Sodium thiopental is mainly metabolized to pentobarbital, 5-ethyl-5-(1'-methyl-3'-hydroxybutyl)-2-thiobarbituric acid, and 5-ethyl-5-(1'-methyl-3'-carboxypropyl)-2-thiobarbituric acid.

Dosage
The usual dose range for induction of anesthesia using thiopental is from 3 to 6 mg/kg; however, there are many factors that can alter this. Premedication with sedatives such as benzodiazepines or clonidine will reduce requirements due to drug synergy, as do specific disease states and other patient factors. Among patient factors are: age, sex, and lean body mass. Specific disease conditions that can alter the dose requirements of thiopentone and for that matter any other intravenous anaesthetic are: hypovolemia, burns, azotemia, liver failure, hypoproteinemia, etc.

Side effects
As with nearly all anesthetic drugs, thiopental causes cardiovascular and respiratory depression resulting in hypotension, apnea, and airway obstruction. For these reasons, only suitably trained medical personnel should give thiopental in an environment suitably equipped to deal with these effects. Side effects include headache, agitated emergence, prolonged somnolence, and nausea. Intravenous administration of sodium thiopental is followed instantly by an odor and/or taste sensation, sometimes described as being similar to rotting onions, or to garlic. The hangover from the side effects may last up to 36 hours.

Although each molecule of thiopental contains one sulfur atom, it is not a sulfonamide, and does not show the allergic reactions of sulfa/sulpha drugs.

Contraindications
Thiopental should be used with caution in cases of liver disease, Addison's disease, myxedema, severe heart disease, severe hypotension, a severe breathing disorder, or a family history of porphyria.

Co-administration of pentoxifylline and thiopental causes death by acute pulmonary edema in rats. This pulmonary edema was not mediated by cardiac failure or by pulmonary hypertension but was due to increased pulmonary vascular permeability.

History
Sodium thiopental was discovered in the early 1930s by Ernest H. Volwiler and Donalee L. Tabern, working for Abbott Laboratories. It was first used in human beings on March 8, 1934, by Dr. Ralph M. Waters in an investigation of its properties, which were short-term anesthesia and surprisingly little analgesia. Three months later, Dr. John S. Lundy started a clinical trial of thiopental at the Mayo Clinic at the request of Abbott. Abbott continued to make the drug until 2004, when it spun off its hospital-products division as Hospira.

Thiopental is famously associated with a number of anesthetic deaths in victims of the attack on Pearl Harbor. These deaths, relatively soon after the drug's introduction, were said to be due to excessive doses given to shocked trauma patients. However, recent evidence available through freedom of information legislation was reviewed in the British Journal of Anaesthesia, which has suggested that this story was grossly exaggerated. Of the 344 wounded that were admitted to the Tripler Army Hospital, only 13 did not survive, and it is unlikely that thiopentone overdose was responsible for more than a few of these.

See also 
Pentobarbital

References

External links 
 PubChem Substance Summary: Thiopental
 Vassallo, Susi, M.D. "Thiopental in Lethal Injection" (Archive). Fordham Urban Law Journal. Vol. 35, issue 4. June 18, 2008. pp. 957–968.

AbbVie brands
AMPA receptor antagonists
GABAA receptor positive allosteric modulators
General anesthetics
Glycine receptor agonists
Hypnotics
Kainate receptor antagonists
Lethal injection components
Nicotinic antagonists
Organic sodium salts
Pfizer brands
Sedatives
Thiobarbiturates
World Health Organization essential medicines